Manchester High School is a public high school located in New Franklin, Ohio about 12 miles south of Akron.  It is part of the Manchester Local School District in the southwestern corner of Summit County, Ohio. The mascot of Manchester is the panther, usually depicted as a black panther, and the school colors are red and black.  The principal of the school is Scott Ross. The school competes in the Pac-7 Conference.

Education
Manchester High School has achieved an "Excellent" rating six years in a row.

After graduation, approximately 75% of the students enroll in post secondary education programs.  Manchester High School students have consistently ranked at or near the top of state assessment scores in comparison to other districts in Summit County.  Students at MHS have a wide variety of extra-curricular activities to become involved in, and excel in the fine arts as well.

Athletics

Football 
Manchester High School is perennial OHSAA playoff and Pac-7 Conference title contender. Through 45 years under head coach Jim France, who replaced Les Olsson, the Panthers have only one losing record with Coach Jay Brophy and have only finished with three non-winning seasons in team history.

Ohio High School Athletic Association State Championships

 Boys Basketball - 1974 
 Girls Softball – 1979, 1990, 2001

References

External links
 School Website
 Alumni Website
 Basketball Website
 Football Website

Public high schools in Ohio
High schools in Summit County, Ohio